Of the 45 persons who have served as presidents of the United States, at least half have displayed proficiency in speaking or writing a language other than English. Of these, only one, Martin Van Buren, learned English as his second language; his first language was Dutch. Four of the earliest presidents were multilingual, with John Quincy Adams and Thomas Jefferson demonstrating proficiency in a number of foreign languages.

James A. Garfield and his successor Chester A. Arthur knew Ancient Greek and Latin, but it was Garfield's ambidexterity that would lead to rumors that he could write both at the same time. Both Theodore and Franklin D. Roosevelt spoke French, and Woodrow Wilson and Franklin D. Roosevelt spoke German. As for Asian languages, James Madison studied Hebrew, Herbert Hoover spoke some Mandarin Chinese, while Barack Obama speaks Indonesian at a conversational level.

18th century

John Adams
John Adams, the second president of the United States, learned to read Latin at a young age. In preparation for attending Harvard University, Adams attended a school for improving his Latin skills. While posted in France during the Revolutionary War, Adams became fluent in French.

19th century

Thomas Jefferson
Thomas Jefferson spoke and read multiple languages, which included French. According to notes he made while traveling in 1788, he was able to speak French, Latin, and Italian. He claimed to be able to read, as of 1817, these languages along with Greek and Spanish. He also studied and wrote about the Anglo-Saxon language (Old English) and studied German to some extent. After his death, a number of other books, dictionaries, and grammar manuals in various languages were found in Jefferson's library, suggesting that he studied additional languages, possibly including Arabic, Irish, and Welsh. His proficiency in these languages is not known.

Regarding Spanish, Jefferson told John Quincy Adams that he had learned the language over the course of nineteen days while sailing from the United States to France. He had borrowed a Spanish grammar and a copy of Don Quixote from a friend and read them on the voyage. Adams expressed skepticism, noting Jefferson's tendency to tell "large stories."

James Madison
James Madison began his studies of Latin at the age of twelve and had mastered Greek, Latin, Italian, and French (the last reportedly with a Scottish accent) by the time he entered the College of New Jersey, later Princeton University. He produced many translations of Latin orations of Grotius, Pufendorf, and Vattel. He also studied Horace and Ovid. He learned Greek as an admissions requirement for higher college learning.

While in college, Madison learned to speak and read Hebrew. When he could have graduated, Madison remained at college for an additional year to study ethics and Hebrew in greater depth.

James Monroe
James Monroe adopted many French customs while a diplomat in Paris, including learning fluent French. The entire Monroe family knew the language, and often spoke it with one another at home.

John Quincy Adams
John Quincy Adams went to school in both France and the Netherlands, and spoke fluent French and conversational Dutch. Adams strove to improve his abilities in Dutch throughout his life, and at times translated a page of Dutch a day to help improve his mastery of the language. Official documents that he translated were sent to the Secretary of State of the United States, so that Adams' studies would serve a useful purpose as well. When his father appointed him United States Ambassador to Prussia, Adams dedicated himself to becoming proficient in German in order to have the tools to strengthen relations between the two countries. He improved his skills by translating articles from German to English, and his studies made his diplomatic efforts more successful.

In addition to the two languages he spoke fluently, he also studied Italian, but he admitted to making little progress in it since he had no one with whom to practice speaking and hearing the language, as well as Russian, but never achieved fluency. Adams also read Latin very well, translated a page a day of Latin text, and studied classical Greek in his spare time.

Martin Van Buren
Martin Van Buren was the only American president who did not speak English as his first language. He was born in Kinderhook, New York, a primarily Dutch community, spoke Dutch as his first language, and continued to speak it at home. He learned English as a second language while attending Kinderhook's local school house. He obtained a small understanding of Latin while studying at Kinderhook Academy and solidified his understanding of English there.

William Henry Harrison
At Hampden–Sydney College, William Henry Harrison spent a considerable time learning Latin, and favored reading about the military history of ancient Rome and Julius Caesar from Latin histories. While there, he also learned a small amount of French.

John Tyler
John Tyler excelled at school, where he learned both Latin and Greek.

James K. Polk
Although James K. Polk had no background in foreign languages upon entering college, he proved a quick learner. Upon graduating from the University of North Carolina, he was asked to give the welcoming address at graduation; he chose to do so in Latin. He proved very proficient in classical languages, and received honors in both Greek and Latin on his degree.

James Buchanan
James Buchanan studied a traditional classical curriculum, which included Latin and Greek, at the private Old Stone Academy before transferring to Dickinson College. He excelled in both subjects.

Rutherford B. Hayes
Rutherford B. Hayes studied Latin and Greek at the Isaac Webb school in Middletown, Connecticut. He initially struggled with the languages, but soon became proficient in them. He also briefly studied French there.

James A. Garfield
James A. Garfield knew and taught both Latin and Greek, and he was the first president to campaign in two languages (English and German). He was also ambidextrous. Stories emerged to the effect that Garfield would entertain his friends by having them ask him questions, and then writing the answer in Latin with one hand while simultaneously writing the answer in Greek with the other. However, specifics of these stories are not documented.

Chester A. Arthur
Chester A. Arthur was known to be comfortable enough in Latin and Greek to converse with other men who knew the languages.

20th century

Theodore Roosevelt
A foreign correspondent noted that although Roosevelt spoke clearly and quickly, he had a German accent while speaking in French. He read both German and French very well and kept a good number of books written in these languages in his personal library. He quite often read fiction, philosophy, religion, and history books in both French and German. He was most comfortable with informal discussions in French, but he made two public addresses in the West Indies in French in 1916. He recognized that, while he spoke French rapidly and was able to understand others, he used unusual grammar "without tense or gender". John Hay, secretary of state under Roosevelt, commented that Roosevelt spoke odd, grammatically incorrect French, but was never difficult to understand.

Though he could read and understand the language thoroughly, Roosevelt struggled to speak German. When Roosevelt attempted to speak with a native German, he had to apologize after botching the attempt. While not fluent in the language, Roosevelt was also able to read Italian. Though he at one point studied Greek and Latin, Roosevelt found both languages a "dreary labor" to translate.

Roosevelt understood some of the Dutch language and taught songs in Dutch to his children and grandchildren, as is documented in a letter in English that he wrote to the painter Nelly Bodenheim in Amsterdam.

Woodrow Wilson
Woodrow Wilson learned German as part of earning his Ph.D. in history and political science from Johns Hopkins University. However, he never claimed proficiency in the language. While he did read German sources when they were available, he often complained about the amount of time and effort it took him.

Herbert Hoover

Herbert Hoover and his wife, Lou Hoover, once translated a book from Latin to English. The pair took five years, and sacrificed much of their spare time, to translating the Latin mining tract De re metallica. While at Stanford University, Hoover had access to the extensive library of John Casper Branner, where he found the important mining book which had never been fully translated into English. For years, five nights of the week were spent translating the book, including naming objects that the author had merely described. The Hoovers also spoke some Mandarin Chinese, having lived in China from April 1899 until August 1900. Lou Hoover studied the language daily in China but Herbert Hoover confessed that he "never absorbed more than a hundred words." Still, the two would converse in their limited Mandarin when they wanted to keep their conversations private from guests or the press.

Franklin D. Roosevelt
Franklin Delano Roosevelt spoke both German and French. He was raised speaking both, as his early education consisted of governesses from Europe preparing him for boarding school in his teens. In particular, he governesses from France and Germany who taught him their respective languages. A Swiss governess, Jeanne Sandoz, furthered his studies in both languages,  particularly stressing French. Roosevelt spent one summer of his schooling in Germany; both his time with his instructors and his frequent trips abroad allowed him to master both German and French, though he always spoke them with a distinct New England accent. Though he never had a mastery of the language, his governesses also taught him a limited amount of Latin.

Roosevelt gave a bilingual speech (in English and French) during a 1936 visit to Quebec City.

Jimmy Carter
Jimmy Carter has a functional command of Spanish, but has never been grammatically perfect. Carter studied the language at the United States Naval Academy and continued his studies while an officer of the United States Navy. Carter sometimes spoke Spanish in 1976 television campaign advertisements, but in his native South Georgia accent.

He could speak fairly fluently, but joked about his sometimes flawed understanding of the language while discoursing with native speakers. Carter has written and given a number of addresses in the Spanish language and sometimes spoke to constituents in Spanish. To practice his Spanish, he and his wife Rosalynn read the Bible in Spanish to each other every night.

Bill Clinton
While a freshman at Georgetown University, Bill Clinton was required to choose a foreign language to study, and chose German because he was "impressed by the clarity and precision of the language". He is able to hold casual conversation in the language. Later, while giving a speech at the Brandenburg Gate, he gave part of a speech in German, pledging to the 50,000 Germans gathered there that "" ("America stands on your side, now and forever").

21st century

George W. Bush
George W. Bush speaks some Spanish and has delivered speeches in the language. His speeches in Spanish have had English interspersed throughout. During his first campaign for the presidency in 2000, some news outlets reported that he was fluent in the language, though a campaign spokeswoman and others described him as having conversational proficiency rather than being "completely fluent."

Barack Obama
From the age of six through ten (1967–1971), Barack Obama lived in Jakarta, Indonesia and attended local Indonesian-language schools. He reportedly was able to exchange greetings and "pleasantries" in "fluent Indonesian" with Indonesia's then-president and others. During a White House interview with an Indonesian journalist, he remarked that he "used to be fluent" in Indonesian but that he had not been able to use it much as an adult. During his 2008 presidential campaign, while promoting foreign-language education in the United States, Obama said, "I don't speak a foreign language. It's embarrassing!"

Table

Notes

References

Bibliography 

 

President
President
Lists of people by language
Lists relating to the United States presidency
Multilingualism